The Ah Hee Diggings, also known as the Chinese Walls, are an area of some  of hand-stacked rock walls in Oregon, U.S., built by Chinese miners who worked for the Ah Hee Placer Mining Company along Granite Creek from 1867 to 1891.

References

 

Chinese-American culture in Oregon
Grant County, Oregon